USS Glide was a sternwheel steamer that served as a tinclad warship during the American Civil War.  Built in 1862, she was purchased for military service late that year by the Union Navy.  After being converted to a tinclad and armed with six 24-pounder Dahlgren guns, she entered service with the Mississippi River Squadron in early January 1863.  Later that month, she saw action in the Battle of Arkansas Post, firing on Confederate-held Fort Hindman.  Sent the next month to Cairo, Illinois, for repairs, Glide was destroyed in a fire of uncertain origin on February 7.

Construction and characteristics
The American Civil War began in 1861, and both the Union and the Confederacy purchased civilian steamboats for use in riverine warfare.  The Union converted some of these steamboats into a class of vessels known as tinclad warships.  These vessels were armored with thin iron armor, in comparison to the heavier armored ironclads, and had light drafts.  One of these vessels purchased and converted into a tinclad was the sternwheel steamer Glide.  She was built at Shousetown, Pennsylvania, in 1862, and was purchased on November 17, under the authority of Acting Rear Admiral David Dixon Porter while the vessel was at Pittsburgh, Pennsylvania.  It cost the government $16,500 to purchase Glide.  Her tonnage was 137 tons, while her further dimensions are unknown.

The process of converting Glide into a tinclad occurred at Cincinnati, Ohio, and Glide was then sent to Cairo, Illinois, to be fitted out.  While at Cairo, it was deemed necessary to reconstruct some of her gun ports, as they were not considered satisfactory.  On December 3, she was commissioned.  Armed with six 24-pounder Dahlgren guns, she was commanded by Acting Lieutenant Selim E. Woodworth.  She was manned by a crew of 38, of whom 30 were African American.

Service history

On January 3, 1863, Glide traveled down the Mississippi River to begin service with the Mississippi River Squadron.  The next day, she was assigned to a flotilla of tinclads led by Lieutenant Commander Watson Smith that had been organized for operations against Confederate-held Fort Hindman.  On January 11, Union Army forces assaulted the fort, and Glide, along with other vessels, provided supporting fire against Confederate batteries at Fort Hindman.  Glide moved upriver to fire into the fort from its rear and, once the fort was captured, attempt to cut off the Confederate retreat. Along with the tinclad USS Rattler, Glide destroyed a ferry upriver from the fort.  After the battle, Glide saw service on the White River, being used as both a transport and as a supply ship.  In early February, she was sent back to Cairo to undergo repairs.

While moored near other vessels on the morning of February 7, a fire broke out on Glide, in the forward part of the ship. The tugboat USS Dahlia towed her into the channel of the Mississippi River away from the other vessels. Two of her crew died in the incident. The Union military later salvaged portions of her machinery, metal fittings (including some of her armor), and at least a portion of her weapons and ammunition. The origin of the fire is uncertain, but an investigation into the loss of the ship suggested it may have originated with a fire in an ashpan some of the crew had been using to warm themselves. Another tinclad named USS Glide served with the West Gulf Blockading Fleet in 1864 and 1865.

References

Sources
 

 
 
 

 
 
 

Ships of the Union Navy
Ships built in Pennsylvania
Gunboats of the United States Navy
American Civil War patrol vessels of the United States
Ship fires
Maritime incidents in February 1863
Steamships of the United States Navy
1862 ships
American Civil War shipwrecks in the Mississippi River